Agricultural Development Bank of Ghana, commonly known as Agricultural Development Bank or ADB, is a government-owned development and commercial bank in Ghana. The bank is the first development finance institution established by the Government of Ghana. It is one of the commercial banks licensed by the Bank of Ghana, the national banking regulator.

History
ADB was established in 1965, by Act of Parliament to meet the banking needs of the Ghanaian agricultural sector in a profitable manner. Before its current name, the bank was known as the Agricultural Credit and Co-operative Bank. The bank changed its name in 1970, when the parliamentary statute was amended to grant the institution full commercial banking powers.

Overview
The Bank is a large development and commercial bank. , ADB was the leading financial institution in agricultural financing in Ghana, responsible for 35% of the total bank industry financing of agriculture. In September  2010, the bank was recognized as Bank Of The Year at the Africa Investor Agribusiness Awards, in Durban, South Africa, the first institution so recognised, at this annual event. The total assets of the institution at the end of December 2011 were valued at approximately US$683.6 million (GHS:1.21 billion).

The bank is currently looking to list on the Ghana stock exchange, and has is currently awaiting government approval to be listed.

Ownership
The bank's stock is owned by the following entities:

Products and services
The bank   engages in other types of banking in addition to  making agricultural loans. The range of services offered include: (a) Development Banking (b) Corporate Banking (c) Personal Banking (d) International Banking (e) Diaspora Banking Services (f) Treasury Management Services and (g) Money Transfer Services, in partnership with Western Union.

Branch network
The Bank maintains a network of eighty-five (85) branches located in all areas of Ghana.  Ghana's capital and largest city.

Awards and recognition 
2020 Ghana Cocoa Awards - Best Cocoa Financing Institution

See also
Economy of Ghana
List of banks in Ghana

References

External links 
 
 Website of Bank of Ghana
 About Ghana Agricultural Development Bank

Banks of Ghana
Companies based in Accra
Banks established in 1965
1965 establishments in Ghana